Matt Franklin Lewis   (born 8 January 1987) is an Australian wheelchair rugby player. He won a gold medal at the 2016 Rio Paralympics as a member of the Australian Steelers.

Personal
Lewis was born on 8 January 1987. In 2011, at the age of 24, he was severely injured when making a home made bomb using a gas cylinder. The bomb making operation went badly wrong and left him in an induced coma for just over a month. He lost most of his fingers and both his legs had to be amputated above the knees. In addition, his hearing is impaired and he has many scars on his body. In 2016, he was completing an electrical apprenticeship. He assists programs that educate young people about the dangers of risk taking.

Wheelchair rugby
Lewis was introduced to wheelchair rugby by Victorian coach Bryce Alman. In 2013/14, he played for Seattle Storm in the USA national league for five months and won a number of MVP awards. In 2014, he was selected to play for the national team the Australian Steelers. In 2016, he was the MVP at the Wheelchair Rugby National Series.

He was a member of the team that retained its gold medal at the 2016 Rio Paralympics after defeating the United States 59–58 in the final. He was awarded the Order of Australia Medal in 2017.

References

External links

Paralympic wheelchair rugby players of Australia
Wheelchair rugby players at the 2016 Summer Paralympics
Victorian Institute of Sport alumni
1987 births
Living people
Medalists at the 2016 Summer Paralympics
Paralympic gold medalists for Australia
Recipients of the Medal of the Order of Australia
Paralympic medalists in wheelchair rugby